Haas Wheat & Partners  is a private equity firm focused on leveraged buyout transactions.  The firm targets specialty middle-market manufacturing, distribution and service companies, particularly family-controlled companies and corporate spin-outs.

The firm is based in Dallas, Texas and was founded in 1992.

History

Hicks & Haas
Robert (Bobby) Haas formed Hicks & Haas together with Tom Hicks in 1984.  Prior to 1984, Haas was a principal of a venture capital firm and a partner in a Midwest law firm specializing in corporate and securities law.  The next year Hicks & Haas firm bought Hicks Communications, a radio outfit run by Hicks' brother Steven.

Hicks & Haas' biggest coup was its mid-1980s acquisition of several soft drink makers, including Dr Pepper and 7 Up. The firm took Dr Pepper/7 Up public just 18 months after merging the two companies.  In all, Hicks & Haas turned $88 million of investor funding into $1.3 billion. The pair split up in 1989; Hicks wanted to raise a large pool to invest, but Haas preferred to work deal by deal.  Tom Hicks went on to form Hicks Muse, which in the late 1990s was one of the largest private equity firms in the US.

1992-2006
In 1992, Robert Haas founded Haas Wheat & Harrison to focus on middle-market transactions.  Among his co-founders were Thomas Harrison, who had previously worked with Haas at Hicks & Haas and Douglas Wheat, a former investment banker with Donaldson, Lufkin & Jenrette.  From 1984 through 1989, Doug Wheat was a member of DLJ Merchant Banking and in 1989, Wheat left DLJ to co-found an investment firm, Grauer & Wheat.  Tom Harrison left the firm in 1996 to join Hoak Communications Partners, the predecessor of what is today, Hoak & Co.

Since 2006
In October 2006, Douglas Wheat announced that he was leaving Haas Wheat to found a new private equity firm, Foxbridge Partners.  In 2007, Foxbridge merged with Challenger Capital Group, founded by Mark Stephens.

References

External links

Haas Wheat & Partners (company website)
Playtex Products to Sell Haas Wheat 40% Stake for $180 million.  New York Times, March 21, 1995
Playtex Shareholders Approve Haas Wheat Financing.  New York Times, June 7, 1995
Haas Wheat & Partners Buys SMC Holdings.  New York Times, November 8, 1996 
Investment Group Buys Nebraska Textbook Company.  New York Times, February 18, 1998
Haas Wheat buys SmartCarte.  Dallas Business Journal, November 22, 1996

Private equity firms of the United States
Financial services companies established in 1992